Geograph Channel Islands is a web-based project, initiated in April 2010, to create a freely accessible archive of geographically located photographs of the Channel Islands.
Photographs in the Geograph Channel Islands collection are chosen to illustrate geographical features all parts of the Channel Islands. It is an offshoot of Geograph Britain and Ireland which began in March 2005.

A few examples of images on the site;

References

Geography of the Channel Islands
British digital libraries
Image-sharing websites
Photo archives in the United Kingdom
Outdoor locating games